Nagarjun is a village development committee in Baitadi District in the Mahakali Zone of Far-Western Nepal. At the time of the 2011 Nepal census it had a population of 1,961 and had 412 houses in the village.

References

Populated places in Baitadi District